Sir George John Aird, 4th Baronet (born 30 January 1940) is a British baronet. He is the son of Sir John Renton Aird, 3rd Baronet and Lady Priscilla Heathcote-Drummond-Willoughby. He is usually called by his middle name John.

Biography
George John Aird was educated at Eton College, and was Page of Honour to The Queen from 1955 to 1957. Later in his life, he studied at Harvard University from which he graduated with a Master of Business Administration (M.B.A.). In 1966 he was registered as a Member of the Institution of Civil Engineers (M.I.C.E.).

He was chairman and managing director of Sir John Aird and Company Limited from 1969 to 1996. In 1981 he was chairman of Matcon.

On his father's death on 20 November 1973, he succeeded him as 4th Baronet. His mother died in December 2002.

On 31 August 1968, he married Margaret Elizabeth Muir (1946–2010), daughter of Sir John Harling Muir, 3rd Baronet. They have three children:
 Rebecca Aird (born 22 July 1970)
 Belinda Elizabeth Aird (born 14 May 1972)
 James John Aird, Esq. (born 12 June 1978)

On 11 August 2011, he married Xiao Fen Wang, an M.B.A. graduate and the daughter of Jing Fen Wang (王景芬) of Beijing, a professor of Chinese calligraphy and a writer of TV series.

Sir John is co-heir presumptive of the barony of Willoughby de Eresby, his mother being an aunt of the present Baroness.

Arms

References

1940 births
Living people
Baronets in the Baronetage of the United Kingdom
Harvard Business School alumni
People educated at Eton College
Pages of Honour
British expatriates in the United States